Idrottsarvet: årets bok (en: Sports Heritage: Year Book) is a Swedish sport yearbook established in 1986. It is published annually by the Sports Museum of Gothenburg (Idrottsmuseet i Göteborg), and edited by Bo W. Karlsson.

External links
 Idrottsarvet website 
 Sports Museum website 

1986 establishments in Sweden
Annual magazines
Sports magazines
Sports mass media in Sweden
Magazines established in 1986
Mass media in Gothenburg
Magazines published in Sweden
Swedish-language magazines